Luc Ferrari (February 5, 1929 – August 22, 2005) was a French composer of Italian heritage and a pioneer in musique concrète and electroacoustic music. He was a founding member of RTF's Groupe de Recherches Musicales (GRMC), working alongside composers such as Pierre Schaeffer and Pierre Henry.

Biography

Ferrari was born in Paris, and was trained in music at a very young age. He studied the piano under Alfred Cortot, musical analysis under Olivier Messiaen, and composition under Arthur Honegger. His first works were freely atonal. A case of tuberculosis in his youth interrupted his career as a pianist. From then on he mostly concentrated on musical composition. During this illness he had the opportunity to become acquainted with the radio receiver, and with pioneers such as Schönberg, Berg, and Webern.

In 1954, Ferrari went to the United States to meet Edgard Varèse, whose Déserts he had heard on the radio, and had impressed him. This seems to have had a great effect on him, with the tape part in Déserts serving as inspiration for Ferrari to use magnetic tape in his own music. In 1958 he co-founded the Groupe de Recherches Musicales with Pierre Schaeffer and François-Bernard Mâche. He taught in institutions around the world, and worked for film, theatre and radio. By the early 1960, Ferrari had begun work on his Hétérozygote, a piece for magnetic tape which uses ambient environmental sounds to suggest a dramatic narrative. The use of ambient recordings was to become a distinctive part of Ferrari's musical language.

Ferrari's Presque rien No. 1 'Le Lever du jour au bord de la mer (1970) is regarded as a classic of its kind. In it, Ferrari takes a day-long recording of environmental sounds at a Yugoslavian beach and, through editing, makes a piece that lasts just twenty-one minutes. It has been seen as an affirmation of John Cage's idea that music is always going on all around us, and if only we were to stop to listen to it, we would realise this. Ferrari continued to write purely instrumental music as well as his tape pieces. He also made a number of documentary films on contemporary composers in rehearsal, including Olivier Messiaen and Karlheinz Stockhausen.

Ferrari died in Arezzo, Italy on August 22, 2005, at age 76.

Discography

 Acousmatrix
Petite symphonie intuitive pour un paysage de printemps (1973–74)
Strathoven (1985)
Presque rien avec filles (1989)
Hétérozygote (1963–64)
 BVHAAST 9009 Acousmatrix 3 – 1990

 Unheimlich schön
 Unheimlich schön (1971)
 Coll. Cinéma pour l'oreille
 Metamkine MKCD008 1993

 L'Escalier des aveugles
 Patajaslotcha (1984)
 L'Escalier des aveugles (1991)
 Xavier Legasa  / Donatienne Michel-Dansac / Michel Musseau (song)
 Ensemble Le Banquet, Dir. Olivier Dejours
 Ina-grm ina c 2008/Musidisc 201302 – 1993

 Presque rien
 Music promenade (1964–69)
 Presque rien No.1 – le lever du jour au bord de la mer (1967–70)
 Presque rien No.2 – ainsi continue la nuit dans ma tête multiple (1977)
 Presque rien avec filles (1989)
 Ina-grm 245172  – 1995

 Piano-piano
 Suite pour piano (1952)
 Antisonate (1953)
 Suite hétéroclite (1955)
 Visage I (1956)
 Fragments du journal intime (1980–82)
 Comme une fantaisie dite des réminiscences (1989–91)
 Christine Lagniel / Michel Maurer (Piano)
 Auvidis Montaigne MO 782110 – 1997

 Cellule 75
 Cellule 75 (1975)
 Place des Abbesses (1977)
 Chris Brown (Piano), William Winant (Perc.)
 Tzadik USA – TZ 7033 – 1997

 Interrupteur / Tautologos III
 Interrupteur (1967)
 Tautologos III (1970)
 Ensemble de musique vontemporaine de Paris, Dir. Konstantin Simonovitch
 Blue Chopsticks USA BC1, distrib. France : Chronowax – 1999

 Chansons pour le corps – Et si tout entière maintenant
 Chansons pour le corps
 Elise Caron (Song), Carol Mundinger / Sylvain Frydman (Clar.), Christine Lagniel (Perc.), Michel Maurer (Piano.), Michel Musseau (Synthesizer)
 Et si tout entière maintenant (1986–87)
 Symphonic story. (Prix Italia 1987) – Text by Colette Fellous
 Anne Sée (Voice), Nouvel Orchestre Philharmonique, Dir. Yves Prin.
 Mode Records USA MODE 81 – 1999

 Danses Organiques cinéma pour l'oreille
 Danses organiques (1971–73)
 Elica mpo-3340 – 1999
 vinyle LP Elica 4VL 3704 – 2003

 Far-West news
 Far-West news episode No.1 (1998–99)
 Histoire du plaisir et de la désolation (1979–81)
 Nouvel orchestre de France, Dir. Michael Luig.
 Signature, France ASIN : B00005Q4KU – distribution Harmonia Mundi – 1999

 Cycle des souvenirs  – Exploitation des concepts No.2
 Cycle des souvenirs  – Exploitation des concepts No.2 (1995–2000)
 Blue Chopsticks USA BC8, distrib. France : Chronowax – 2002

 Tautologos and other early electronic works
 Étude aux accidents (1958)
 Étude aux sons tendus (1958)
 Visage V (1958/59)
 Tête et queue du dragon (1959–60)
 Tautologos I (1961)
 Tautologos II (1961)
 Und so weiter for piano and tape (1965–66)
 (works from 1959 to 1966) EMF and GRM
 Gérard Frémy (piano)
 EMF CD 037 – 2003

 Comedia dell'amore 224 (1992)
 Performers and composers : Jean-Jacques Birgé, Francis Gorgé, Bernard Vitet and Luc Ferrari
 Un Drame musical instantané "Opération Blow up"  GRRR 2020 – distrib. France : Orkhêstra / Les Allumés du Jazz – 1992

 Impro-micro-acoustique (2001)
 Performers and composers : Noël Akchoté, Roland Auzet and Luc Ferrari
 Blue Chopsticks, USA BC12 –  distrib. France : Chronowax  – 2004

 Collection
 Collection de petites pièces ou 36 Enfilades pour piano et magnétophone (1985)
 Jeu du hasard et de la détermination (1999)
 Michel Maurer (Piano.), Françoise Rivalland (Perc.).
 Les empreintes digitales, France – distribution Abeille Musique (Nocturne) ED13171 – 2004

 Les Anecdotiques
 Les Anecdotiques – Exploitation des Concepts No.6 (2002)
 SUB ROSA SR 207 – 2004
 Grand Prix 2005 Charles Cros in Memoriam

 Archives sauvées des eaux
 Archives sauvées des eaux – Exploitation des concepts No.1 (2000)
 Version for plastic, Milan 2004. By Luc Ferrari and Erikm
 Angle Records, Italie CD 0008 – 2004
 Grand Prix 2005 Charles Cros in memoriam

 Son mémorisé
 Presque Rien No.4 (1990–98)
 Promenade symphonique dans un paysage musical ou Un jour de fête à El Oued en 1976 : (1976–78)
 Saliceburry cocktail (2002)
 Sub Rosa, SR252 – 2006

 Far-West news episodes 2 and 3
 Far-West news episodes 2 (May 1999)
 Far-West news episodes 3 (June 1999)
 Blue Chopsticks BC16 CD September 2006

 Et tournent les sons
 Et tournent les Sons dans la Garrigue – Réflexion sur l'écriture No.1 (1977)
 Archives sauvées des eaux – Exploitation des concepts No.3 (2000)
 By the Ensemble Laborintus and Erikm
 Césaré 06/03/4/2/1 France septembre 2006. Distr. Metamkine

 Les ProtoRythmiques
 Les ProtoRythmiques (2007)
 EriKm (Luc Ferrari) and Thomas Lehn
 Room40 RM417/ May 2007

 Didascalies
 Rencontres fortuites (2003) for viola, piano and memorized sounds.
 Didascalies (2004) for viola and piano
 Tautologos III  (1969)
 By Vincent Royer and Jean-Philippe Collard-Neven
 Luc Ferrari facing his tautology – 2 days before the end,
 a film by Guy Marc Hinant and Dominique Lohlé
 Sub Rosa SR261 luc ferrari "didascalies" / cd+ dvd   / May 2007

 Sonopsys
 Passage pour mimes (1959)
 J'ai été coupé (1960–69)
 Selbstportrait oder Peinture de sons ou bien Tonmalerei (1996–97)
 Sonopsys 4 – Cahiers musique concrète/acousmatique. May 2007

 in OHM: The Early Gurus of Electronic Music / 1943 – 1980
 Music Promenade (1969)
 Ellipsis arts......  EA500-4 USA

 in Asia – Trio d'argent
 Madame de Shanghaï (1996)
 Michel Boizot / François Daudin Clavaud / Xavier Saint-Bonnet (Flutes)
 Musique d'Aujourd'hui 9701 MDA M7 847 – 1997

 in  An anthology of noise & electronic music / vol. #2
 Visage V (1958–59)
 Sub Rosa SR200 – 2003

 in Early modulations : vintage volts
 Tête et queue du dragon  (1959–60)
 Caipirinha CP219 USA – 2000

 in Archives GRM – CD 2/5
 Étude aux sons tendus (1958)
 Étude floue  (1958)
 Étude aux accidents (1958)
 Ina c 1032(2004) ADD – 750 – 276522

 Chantal, or the portrait of a villager (1977–78)
 stereo tape.
 in collaboration with Brunhild Meyer.
 Digital on-line edition 2008
 Room 40

 Archives Génétiquement Modifiées  (2000) – mémorized sound
 Société II (1967)
 for four soloists and sixteen instruments (flute, oboe, clarinet, bassoon, horn, trumpet, trombone, 4 violins, 2 violas, 2 violoncellos, 1 contrabass. Soloists: 1 piano, 3 percussions.) recording from 1968 by the EIMCP dir. Konstantin Simonovich.
 Robot Records, USA

 À la recherche du rythme perdu
 for piano and memorized sound. by Wilhem Latchoumia
 In Wilhem Latchoumia – piano & electronic sounds
 Sisyphe 013

 Madame de Shanghaï (1996)
 for 3 flutes and memorized sound
 In Manuel Zurria repeat !
 Die Schachtel, Zeit C01

Archives sauvées des eaux – Luc Ferrari with Otomo Yoshihide.
 Bonus-track (CD extra) for the first 2000 copies : « Slow landing » Luc Ferrari with Otomo Yoshihide, Camera: Miyaoka Hideyuki and Nishihara Tazz Miyaoka
 Disc Callithump CPCD-001

 Labyrinthe de violence
 Danse
 LP Alga Marghen
 Disque vinyle PLANA-F alga027 – 2009

 Sexolidad (1982–83)
 Dialogue Ordinaire avec la Machine (1984)
 Elica mpo-4301 – 2009

 INA-GRM Box (2009)
 contains 10 CD Luc Ferrari’s works for memorized sound as well as film music.

 Chantal (2009)
 stereo tape (1977–78)
 in collaboration with Brunhild Meyer.
 Ohm/Avatar – ohm 051

 DIDASCALIES  2 ou Trois  en quête de notes (2005)
 For two pianos and a third very strong instrument capable to uphold a very strong note.
 Claude Berset and Jean-Philippe Collard-Neven, piano – Vincent Royer, viola
 Recorded at La Chaux-de-Fonds, Switzerland
 Vinyl disc Sub rosa SRV 305- April 2010

 TRANQUILLES IMPATIENCES (2010)
 by Brunhild Ferrari recomposing tapes from Luc Ferrari called "Exercices d'Improvisation”
 vinyle disc ALGA MARGHEN – 2010 – plana-MF alga028

 EPHÉMÈRE I & II (1974)
 for tape and undetermined instrumentation
 éphémère I – L'ordinateur ça sert à quoi ?  Nov ; 1974
 éphémère II – Lyon 75 Nov. 1975
 ALGA MARGHEN plana f. 33 NMN 081  – 2010

 EXERCICES D'IMPROVISATION (1977)
 Suite of exercices (5 to 7 min. each) – can be individual or collective improvisation for any instrument or instrument group (maximum 8). They are intended for amateurs, professionals or students and may take place in concerts.
 By Gol and Brunhild Ferrari
 Vinyl disc ALGA MARGHEN planam 5 (it) – 2010

 PIANO & PERCUSSION WORKS
 Satoko Inoue piano & Toshiyuki Matsukura percussion
 CONVERSATION INTIME (October 1987 – March 1988) 19:33
for piano and percussion
 VISAGE I (1956) 7:21 for piano
 SONATINE ELYB POUR PIANO (1953–54)  – 7 :44 for piano
 CELLULE 75 – FORCE DU RYTHME ET CADENCE FORCEE (May – November 1975) 32:45
 for piano, percussions and tape
 Recorded in 2004 – Hat(now)ART 165 – Jan. 2011  – harmonia mundi
	
 LUC FERRARI " Madame de Shanghai " – " Après Presque Rien " – " Visage 2 "
 VISAGE 2 (1955–56) – 10'02
 APRES PRESQUE RIEN (2004) – 31'47 (commissioned by Art Zoyd, Musiques Nouvelles and CCMIX)
 MADAME DE SHANGHAI (1996) – 15'22
 By the Scottish Flute Trio and Ensemble Musiques Nouvelles, cond. Jean-Paul Dessy
 Mode 228 – Feb. 2011

 VISITATION  (1 avril 2011) – 25'23
 eRikm & Luc Ferrari – The night bird, Cap 15 and night bird, Tuchan, in Presque Rien N0 2
 Vinyle disc Alga Marghen Planam 18 (it) – 2011

 Souvenir, Souvenir
 SUITE (1952)
 SUITE HÉTÉROCLITE
 SONATINE ELYB
 VISAGE I
 COLLECTION DE PETITES PIÈCES OU 36 ENFILADES POUR PIANO ET MAGNÉTOPHONE
 piano : Elmar Schrammel – WERGO 67372

 JETZT ou PROBABLEMENT MON QUOTIDIEN IL EST LA, DANS LA CONFUSION DES LIEUX ET DES MOMENTS – Hörspiel 1982 – 1 h. 45'
 Radio composition for Hessischer Rundfunk.	. 			
			
 Ferrari (r)écouté
 new compositions with sound material of Ferrari's JETZT tapes from:
 Tiziana Bertoncini – Antje Vowinckel – Frank Niehusmann – David Fenech – Neele Hülcker
			
 COMPOSER LA RADIO – DAS RADIO KOMPONIEREN
 excerpts from a radio conférence with Luc Ferrari (2000)
 produced by ZKM, Karlsruhe and WERGO. – WERGO ZKM milestones 2066.2 – 2011

 PROGRAMME COMMUN  Luc + Brunhild Ferrari
 Double CD

 Luc Ferrari:
 MUSIQUE SOCIALISTE, or PROGRAMME COMMUN POUR CLAVECIN ET BANDE MAGNETIQUE  – (1972)
 harpsichord: Elisabeth Chojnacka

 DIDASCALIES 2 – (2005)
 for 2 pianos and a third very powerful instrument that can hold a very loud note :  viola
 Jean-Philippe Collard-Neven et Claude Berset : piano. Vincent Royer : viola

 LES EMOIS D’APHRODITE – (1986) Version 1998
 for clarinet, piano, percussion, 2 samplers and memorized sound
 by the ensemble MC BAND, dir. Mary Chun, San Francisco

 Brunhild Ferrari  –  electroacoustic, with sounds from Luc Ferrari :
 DERIVATIF – (2008)
 BRUMES DU REVEIL –  (2009)
 TRANQUILLES IMPATIENCES – (2010) 	
 Sub Rosa SR363 AB  – www.SUBROSA.NET

 LUC FERRARI « PRESQUE RIEN »
 double vinyl discs
 PRESQUE RIEN No.1
 PRESQUE RIEN No. 2
 PRESQUE RIEN AVEC FILLES
 PRESQUE RIEN No. 4 – La remontée du Village
 Recollectio GRM 2012 – REGRM 005 et éditions MEGO – INA GRM

 L. FERRARI
 UND SO WEITER for electric piano and tape
 Gérard Frémy, Piano
 MUSIC PROMENADE original mix
 re-issue of the vinyl disc by WERGO from 1969 – WER 67752 – 2012

CD and DVD releases

 Didascalies
 Rencontres Fortuites (2003) pour alto, piano et SM.
 Didascalies (2004) pour alto et piano
 Tautologos 3 (1969)
 by Vincent Royer, viola  and Jean-Philippe Collard-Neven, piano
 + DVD
 Luc Ferrari face à sa tautologie – 2 jours avant la fin
 Film by Guy-Marc Hinant and Dominique Lohlé
 French version, with English sub-titles, recorded while the rehearsal of Tautologos III.
 "that would be Luc’s last one in this beginning of July 2005.
 Sub Rosa SR261 luc ferrari "didascalies" / cd+ dvd   / mai 2007

 This Box was rewarded with the « Coup de Coeur Charles  Cros – musique contemporaine printemps 2008 » and the Grand Prix from the festival "Filmer à tout prix", Brussels in 2008

 Presque rien avec Luc Ferrari
 Film by Jacqueline Caux and Olivier Pascal – with Elise Caron – eRikm – Christof  	Schläger .  2004.
 ELICA VPO-4290
 Robot Records 2008
 Forced Exposure; Métamkine, Fr.; Die Schachtel, It.; Mimaroglu Music Sales; 	Die Stadt, Germ.; A-Musik, Cologne, Germ.; Empreintes Digitales, Montreal 	Can.; Disk Union, Tokyo, Jap.

 Les Archives sauvées des Eaux
 Luc Ferrari with Otomo Yoshihide.
 « Slow Landing » Luc Ferrari with Otomo Yoshihide, Camera: Miyaoka Hideyuki and Nishihara Tazz Miyaoka
 Disc Callithump CPCD-001

Recent book releases
 Collective book, edited by Brunhild Ferrari : Luc Ferrari complete works, London May 2019, 457 p.. Published par Ecstatic peace library (UK).
Presque Rien avec Luc Ferrari
 book by Jacqueline Caux. Discussion with Luc Ferrari.
 Editions Main d’œuvre, Nice – January 2001

 translation into Japanese by Ryosuke Shiina (Tokyo, 2006)
 Luc Ferrari to hotondo nanimo nai.
 Editions Gendaishichô-shinsha (2006), Tokyo, Japan.

 translation into English by Jérôme Hansen.
 Almost Nothing with Luc Ferrari. Editions Errant Bodies (2013)

 Sonopsys No. 4 Luc Ferrari
 Cahiers Musique Concrète / Acousmatique, published by Licences (French – English) – 2007
 by Alexandre Yterce and Florence Gonot

 Luc Ferrari Portraits Polychromes
 supplemented edition by GRM / INA – 2007 – grm@ina.fr	

 The Politics of Presque Rien by Eric Drott
 in Sound Commitments (Oxford University Press, 2009).
 P. 145-166. Pdf to download on the website on “bibliography” 2009 page 9

 Luc Ferrari in: In the Blink of an Ear:
 Toward a Non-Cochlear Sonic Art
 by Seth Kim- Cohen. (Continuum, 2009). "Sound-Out-Of-Itself" p. 175-185.
 Pdf to download on the website on “bibliography” 2009 page 9

 Luc Ferrari in : Silence, les couleurs du prisme & la mécanique du temps qui passe. Les Presque Rien – Et Tournent les sons Dans la Garrique by Daniel Caux
 Editions de l’Eclat, Paris. Pages 333–337 (2009)
	
 Syntone News and Critique of the Radio-Art
 the Radio of Luc (and his listeners)
 Chantal Dumas – François Parra – Irvic Oliver – José Iges – Götz Naleppa – Lucien Bertolina.
 Contributions collected and conducted by Etienne Noiseau. Edited by Etienne Noiseau

 The Bells Angels No. 2 
 Magazine TBA No 2 July 2010-07-03 containing the score of
 Monologos (for solo voice and électroacoustic device) – 1970 – as well as
 Concepts (3 excerpts of Jacqueline Caux’ book: Presque Rien avec Luc Ferrari
 éditions nuitdencre galerie 64 rue jean-pierre timbaud – 75011 paris

 The Bells Angels
 Magazine TBA No 3 – 2011
 10 photoengraving-works by Luc Ferrari

Bibliography

1959	Luc Ferrari: "Stages of the Vision/Stages of the Production" in Expériences musicales – Concrete music – exotic Electronics Revue Musicale No. 244, Paris 1959, p. 8 – 10

1967	"Luc Ferrari" by Pierre Schaeffer in La Musique Concrète Que Sais-Je. Presses Universitaires de France, Paris 1967, p. 108 – 113

1970	"Luc Ferrari". Interview by Denys Lémery. In Actuel No. 12, 1970, p. 14 – 18

1971	Luc Ferrari – "Für Wen Komponieren Sie Eigentlich?" (For whom do you actually compose?) By Hansjörg Pauli
Ed. S. Fischer – Frankfurt 1971, p. 37 – 59

1972	"Discussion with Luc Ferrari" by François-Bernard Mâche. In Nouvelle Revue Française No. 232, 1972

1973	"Luc Ferrari Les Danses Organiques". Remarks collected by Daniel Caux in Art Vivant – Le Corps (The body) 2, No. 41, July 1973, p. 30 – 32

1974	Tibor Kneif: "Types of the « Entsprachlichung" » in The New Music 1
Stephan, Rudolf (ed.): "About music and language. Seven Attempts about the Newer Vocal Music"
Mainz (Schottt) 1974, 

1974	Luc Ferrari. "Interrupteur, Tautologos 3, Ensemble Instrumental de Musique Contemporaine de Paris, Konstantin Simonovitch". By Klaus Stahmer. In Melos Heft IV, July–August 1974, p. 242 – 244

1975	"Allo, Ici la Terre..." (Hello, the Earth is speaking) by Luc Ferrari. In Art Vivant – La Mort, (The Death) No. 54, January 1975, p. 22 – 23

1977	Luc Ferrari – "Für Wen Komponieren Sie Eigentlich?" (For whom do you actually compose?)
By Hansjörg Pauli
Reproduction in Beiträge zur Musikwissenschaft, Heft 4, 1977, p. 260 – 269

1977	"Luc Ferrari". Discussion with David Jisse. In Unison No. 3 Paris, May 1977, p. 14 – 16

1977	Reflections by Luc Ferrari on "Does the Music of Future Have a Future?". In Cahiers Recherche/Musique, INA-GRM, 1977, p. 77 – 79

1978	François-Bernard Mâche: LES MAL ENTENDUS. Composers of the 70s
In Revue musicale No. 314, 1978, p. 65 – 69

1978	"Srefacia a... y Reflexion Sobre... por Luc Ferrari"
– UN PUEBLO NUMERO 11350 por Luc Ferrari
In Arte Nuevo 1,  Universidad Veracruzana 1978, p. 10 – 13

1979	Luc Ferrari "Erudite Cultures and Popular Cultures". Interview by Catherine Millet
In Art Press International, No. 26, March 1979, p. 18

1981	Luc Ferrari – dossier "En attendant Enée". In Cahier de l'animation musicale, No. 19, June 1981, p. 11 – 12

1981	"Discussion with Luc Ferrari". Remarks collected by Francis Hofstein. Jazz Magazine – 1981, p. 26 – 29

1981	"Discussion with Luc Ferrari" by Denis Levaillant
In L'Improvisation Musicale, Editions J.C. Lattès 1981, p. 4 – 7

1983	Luc Ferrari "The Music is also Word. Journal Intime." Interview by Michel Giroud. In Canal, No. 54, November 1983, p. 19

1983	Luc Ferrari. "Société 1" text-score. In Chemin de Ronde, Vol. 3, 1983,

1985	Luc Ferrari. "About the pleasure of the desire – Histoire du Plaisir et de la Désolation". By Klaus HiNoich Stahmer. In Melos, No. 4, 1985, p. 19 – 33

1986	Luc Ferrari. "Moderato ma non troppo" by P. Minod. In Restons Simples (Creativ Media), No. 2, January 1986, p. 68 – 69

1989	"Hörspiel – Création radiophonique – Radio Art Je Me Suis Perdu – Abyrinthe Portrait from Luc Ferrari" by Michel Dumont. In Magazine Kanal, No. 42, April 1989, p. 60 – 61

1990	"Luc Ferrari". Interview by Stephane Ollivier. In Revue et Corrigée, No. 5, Spring 1990, p. 4 – 7

1990	"Composesrs and Rhetoric". Discussion between François Delalande and Luc Ferrari
In 20 Analyse Musicale, Paris June 1990, p. 47 – 49

1993	"Ça Frotte" (It brushes) by Luc Ferrari. In L'Evidence, No. 2, Autumn 1993, p. 24 – 27

1993	"Analyse – Journal" (Analysis Diary) by Luc Ferrari. In Musiques d'Aujourd'hui Conseil Général de la Creuse – December 1993, p. 69 – 77

1995	"Luc Ferrari Presque Rien". By Jérôme Noetinger. In Revue et Corrigé, No. 26, December 1995, p. 35

1996	"Discussion with Luc Ferrari". Ch. Zanesi
In Ars Sonora, No. 3, March 1996, p. 7 – 15

1996 	"Discussion with Luc Ferrari". By Danielle Cohen-Levinas. In La Règle du Jeu – 1996

1996	Luc Ferrari in: "Recherches sur la Transformation du Temps Musical sous L’Angle de la Philosophie Japonaise" (Research on the transformation of musical time under the angle of Japanese philosophy). by Ryôsuke SHIINA, Université de Lille III, 9, rue Auguste Angellier, 59046 Lille Cedex

1996	"Je Courais tan de Buts Divers..." (I was running in so many different directions...). Contemporary music review Vol. 15. G+B Arts International, London, p. 95 – 104

1997	Sandeep Bhagwati: "Two French Composers" (Georges Aperghis and Luc Ferrari)
In Jahrbuch der Bayrischen Akademie der Schönen Künste 11. 1997, p. 391 – 399

1997	Luc Ferrari in "The Art of the Fixed Sounds", by Jean-Noël von der Weid,
In La musique du XXe siècle Editions Hachette (Pluriel), p. 221 – 223

1997	"Luc Ferrari". Interview by Haruyuki Suzuki.
In Eigageijutsu, No. 383, Japan 1997

1998	"Minimal or Not Luc Ferrari". Interview by Karen Tanaka
In Musée – a shape of miles – Tower records – Vol. 12, Japan, March 1998, p. 14

1998	Luc Ferrari in: "Aspects de la Notation Verbale Essai de Taxinomie des Propositions Verbales des Années Soixante et Soixante-Dix. Mémoire du DEA" (Essay on taxonomy of the verbal proposals of the Sixties and seventies) Memory of the DEA by Radosveta Kouzmanova Bruzaud
U.F.R. de Musique et Musicologie du XXe siècle – Université de Paris IV-Sorbonne, Oct.1998

1998	Luc Ferrari – "Interview with an Intimate Iconoclast" by Brigitte Robindoré
In Computer Music Journal, Vol. 22, No. 3 – Autumn, p. 8 – 16

1999	Luc Ferrari. Remarks collected by Dan Warburton
Peace Warriors No. 10 – January

1999	Luc Ferrari in: "La Notation Verbale au Service de Rituel" (the verbal notation with the service of the ritual) Colloquia Musique et Rites May 17–19, 1999 by Radosveta Bruzaud

1999	"Serial Deviant" by Dan Warburton. The Wire – April, p. 26 – 28

1999	Luc Ferrari "Far West News". In Soundscapes – VPRO Hilversum – NL, November 1999, p. 20 – 21

1999	"Lots of Luc Ferrari" by John Palmer
In 20th Century Music, San Anselmo CA., USA, December, p. 3 – 10

1999	"Luc Ferrari's Art of Tautology Vous plairait-il de tautologuer avec moi?" (Would you like to tautologize with me?)
Interview by Jacqueline Caux – French / English
In Art Press International, No. 252 – December 1999, p. 49 – 52

2000	Luc Ferrari in conversation with J. Palmer
In SAN Journal of Electroacoustic Music, London, p. 36 – 44

2000	Luc Ferrari. "About the publication of the CD: Chansons pour le Corps et si Tout Entière Maintenant" by Ryosuke Shiina. In Musée – sacrifice fly – Tower records – Vol. 23, Japan, January, p. 93 – 107

2000	11. Karl-Sczuka-Preis 1972, p. 99–101
PORTRAITSPIEL
27. Karl-Sczuka-Preis 1988, p. 184–190
VERIRRT. EIN LABYRINTH
In Akustische Spielformen SWR SchrifteNoeihe « Grundlagen 1 » Spring 2000

2000	Luc Ferrari in: LE CONCERT ENJEUX, FONCTIONS, MODALITÉS
JEU DE SOCIÉTÉ OU LA THEATRALISATION DU CONCERT (Stakes, functions, methods
parlour game or the THEATRALISATION in the concert by Radosveta Bruzaud
Harmattan – Logique Sociale, p. 137 – 174

2000	Luc Ferrari. Remarks collected by Ryosuke Shiina
In Poetry and Criticism: Eureka 5 / 2000, p. 39 – 51

2001	Luc Ferrari. Portraits Polychromes. Co-Edition Cdmc, Ina Groupe Edition-Documentation 2001-06-13

2001	Luc Ferrari in "Die Kunst der Fixierten Klänge" (The art of the fixed sounds) by Jean-Noël von der Weid,
In Die Musik des 20. Jahrhunderts Insel-Verlag, Leipzig, p. 332 – 335

2002	Presque Rien avec Luc Ferrari (Almost nothing with Luc Ferrari)
260 pages with photographs. Author: Jacqueline Caux. Discussions with Jacqueline Caux
Publication January 2001 Editions Main d’Oeuvre, Nice  Tel./Fax 04 93 92 42 49

2002	"Luc Ferrari, or Memory as Non-Music" par Ryosuke Shiina
In Bulletin of Institute for Interdisciplinary Studies of Culture Vol.19
Doshisha Women’s College, Japan, March 31/2, 002

2002	"Cinéma pour les oreilles about Almost Nothing with Luc Ferrari" by Jacqueline Caux
In Les INoockuptibles August 14 to 20, 2002 No. 351, p. 58 – 59

2003 T. Möller: Luc Ferrari, in Komponisten der Gegenwart, (composers of the present) 26. Subsequent edition 12/03.

2003 Luc Ferrari: "Impro-Micro-Acoustique" by Noël Akchoté in Skug No. 57– Austria, p. 49

2004	Luc Ferrari in: "Le Mot dans la Partition au Vingtième Siècle" (The Word in the Score at the Twentieth Century) Thesis of Doctorate of Music and Musicology of the 20th century by Radosveta Kouzmanova Bruzaud
U.F.R. de Musique et Musicologie – Université de Paris IV – Sorbonne, December. 2004

2004	"La Musique et Son Dehors – Re la Musique Anecdotique à L’Arythmie (Music and its outside – Anecdotic Music with the Arrhythmia) by David Sanson et Pierre Yves Macé. In Mouvement No. 30, p. 48–59

2004	Luc Ferrari interviews by Dan Warburton "Invisible Jukebox". In The Wire No. 242 April 2004, p. 20–23

2005	"L'Escalier des Aveugles a Hörspiel" from Luc Ferrari (The staircase of the blinds). By Andrea Cohen in Les compositeurs et l'art radiophonique (The composers and the radiophonic art) thesis of Doctorate. Sorbonne-Paris IV 2005

2005	"L’Eloge de l’Arythmie. Le Hasard avec Détermination". (The Praise of the Arrhythmia
The chance with determination. For his 75th birthday... By David Sanson et Pierre Yves Macé In Mouvement Musique Action, Cahier Spécial, May 18–29, 2005, p. 10–12

2005	Luc Ferrari "Cycles des Souvenirs – Exploitation des Concepts" (Cycle of memories – Exploitation of the Concepts). From the "Diary in disorder or the pursuit of the daily life sounds". In Temporale Edizioni Studio Dabbeni – Lugano – No. 60-61 – 2005
"Joueurs Aspendiens" a cura di Gabiele Bonomo, p. 56–60

2005	Page of the score "Tautologies et Environs" – Exploitation Des Concepts No. 4. 2000–2001 in Sound Visions p. 91, Pfau-Verlag, Saarbrücken, Editors Möller/Shim/Stäbler.

2005	Möller, Torsten: Please, Just Go Your Way... – Luc Ferrari died in the Italian Arrezzo at the age of 76 years In: NZfM 6., p. 42–43

2005	Möller, Torsten: Zum Tod Von Luc Ferrari, (Luc Ferrari died) in: Dissonanz/Dissonance 92 (December 2005), p. 43

2005	Luc Ferrari in MusikTexte Heft 107, November 2005
« Always Unconventional» Remembering Luc – Peter-michael Hamel.
« The Composer, Radio Play and Film Producer Luc Ferrari » Tatjana Böhme-mehner.
« An Alternative to the Opera. Luc Ferrari About Music Theater » – Jacqueline Caux.
« Sounds, Sounds… The Pieces of Almost Nothing» From Luc Ferrari – Daniel Teruggi.
« The Drama of Even the Life». Luc Ferrari’s « Cellule 75 » – Monika Lichtenfeld.
« What Would Be, If? Stravinsky Meets Beethoven In Luc Ferrari’s Studio» – Klaus Mehner.
« The True Or Untrue Story Of Cahier Du Soir» (1991–1992) » – Luc Ferrari.
« Each Time… », « The City Of The Future», Autobiographies From Luc Ferrari.
In memory of Luc Ferrari. « “Committed observer of the reality, Luc Ferrari » – Daniel Caux.

2005	Luc Ferrari in: La musique du XXe siècle. – Jean Noël von der Weid. Hachette. . 2005. P. 359-363

2005	"The Lesson of Freedom – Remembering Luc Ferrari (1929–2005)"
By John Palmer – Guilherme Vaz – Hildegard Westerkamp
In Soundscape Vol. 6 No. 1

2006 K.T. Goldbach: "Akusmatisches und ökologisches Hören in Luc Ferraris Presque rien avec filles", (acousmatic and ecologic listening in Luc Ferrari’s Presque rien avec filles) in: Zeitschrift der GMTH 3, H. 1

2006	Böhme-Mehner, Tatjana: "He Always Composed... Until Himself. The Computer, Electroacoustician, and Film Producer Luc Ferrari". In: Dissonanz/Dissonance 93 (March 2006), p. 4–9

2006	Random Notes – Luc Ferrari 1929–2005 by David Cotner in SIGNAL TO NOISE Winter 2006  issue #40  operations@signaltonoisemagazine.com

2006	Salut Luc
By Carole Rieussec, David Grubbs, Alessandro Bosetti, Li Ping Ting, Jean-Christophe Camps, Jérôme Noetinger, Chantal Dumas, eRikm, Jean-Baptiste Favory
In revue & corrigée No. 67, March 2006

2006	Almost Nothing with Luc Ferrari
Book by Jacqueline Caux. Discussions with Jacqueline Caux
Published in January 2001 Editions Main d’Oeuvre, Nice  Tel./Fax 04 93 92 42 49
Published in Japanese by Ryosuke Shiina, Tokyo, March 2006

2007	Sonopsys No. 4 Luc Ferrari
Cahier Musique Concrète / Acousmatique by Florence Gonot and Alexandre Yterce,
Edition LICENCES. Publication at the moment of the premiere of Morbido Symphonie in Paris on May 11, 2007.
Art-book with CD.

2007	Luc Ferrari – Portraits Polychromes, Published by INA/GRM, Collection directed by Evelyne Gayou. New increased edition

2007	Almost Nothing with Luc Ferrari
By Toshiharu Osato in "nobody", critic film-, music-, literature-review
Published May–June 2007 No. 25, Japan. Pages 47–57:

References

External links
 Luc Ferrari official website of the composer.
Maison ONA publishes the near-complete catalogue of the composer's music.
 Paristransatlantic.com: Luc Ferrari Interview by Dan Warburton, July 22, 1998
 Otherminds.org: Luc Ferrari
 The online music review La Folia has review articles about Ferrari: "Presque Fin": Ferrari Almost Final and Luc Ferrari, Head and Tail

Musicians from Paris
20th-century classical composers
21st-century classical composers
French classical composers
French male classical composers
Electroacoustic music composers
1929 births
2005 deaths
Pupils of Arthur Honegger
Tzadik Records artists
20th-century French composers
21st-century French composers
20th-century French male musicians
21st-century French male musicians
Sub Rosa Records artists